Peter Papps (born 26 November 1939) is an Australian former sports shooter. He competed in the 25 metre pistol event at the 1956 Summer Olympics.

References

1939 births
Living people
Australian male sport shooters
Olympic shooters of Australia
Shooters at the 1956 Summer Olympics
Place of birth missing (living people)